Levent is a Turkish masculine name derived from Levend and a surname. People with the name include:

Given name
 Levent Ateş (born 1991), Turkish middle-distance runner
 Levent Ayçiçek (born 1994), German footballer of Turkish descent
 Levent Çoker (born 1958), Turkish musician
 Levent Devrim (born 1969), Turkish football manager
 Levent Ersöz (born 1954), Turkish general
 Levent Gülen (born 1994), Turkish-Swiss footballer 
 Levent Kartop (born 1979), Turkish footballer
 Levent Kazak (born 1967), Turkish screenwriter and actor
 Levent Kırca (1948–2015), Turkish comedian, stage and film actor, columnist and politician
 Levent Osman (born 1977), Australian footballer
 Levent Topsakal (born 1966), Turkish basketball player
 Levent Tuncat (born 1988), German taekwondo practitioner of Turkish descent
 Levent Üzümcü (born 1972), Turkish actor
 Levent Yılmaz (born 1990), Turkish footballer
 Levent Yüksel (born 1964), Turkish singer

Middle name
 Mustafa Levent Göktaş (born 1959), Turkish colonel

Surname
Haluk Levent (born 1968), Turkish musician

See also
Levente, a Hungarian name derived from Turkish Levent

Turkish masculine given names